Miss Thailand Universe 2011, the 12th Miss Thailand Universe pageant held at Royal Paragon Hall, Siam Paragon in Bangkok, Thailand on March 26, 2011. The contestants will camp in Lamphun. before flying back to Bangkok for the final stage. Fonthip Watcharatrakul, Miss Thailand Universe 2010, will crown her successor at the end of this event.

In the final round, broadcast live on BBTV Channel 7, Chanyasorn Sakornchan, was crowned Miss Thailand Universe 2011 by Ximena Navarrete, Miss Universe 2010 from Mexico.

The winner will be the representative for Miss Thailand at the Miss Universe 2011 pageant in Sao Paulo, Brazil and the 1st Runner-up will compete at Miss Earth 2011 in Manila, Philippines.

Results

Placements
Color keys

The winner and two runner-up were awarded to participate internationally (two title from the Big Four international beauty pageants and one minor international beauty pageants) positions were given in the following order:

Placements

Special awards

Judges
 Preeya Kullavanich 
 Patra Sila-on - President S&P Public Company Limited Thailand.
 Vichoke Mukdamanee
 Petcharaporn Watcharapol
 Apasra Hongsakula - Miss Universe 1965
 Natalie Glebova - Miss Universe 2005
 Chutima Durongdej - Miss Thailand Universe 2009
 Sudarat Burapachaisri
 Siam Sangworiboot - Publisher Theater
 Suradej Kaewthamai
 Sukollawat Kanaros - Actor

Delegates

Notes
 #6 Thirawan Lompitak competed in Miss Thailand 2009, where she placed at the Top 10.
 #34 Patsaraporn Khonkhamhaeng competed in Miss Thailand Universe 2009, where she placed at the Top 12.
 #42 Punyawee Rattanapattarapong competed in Miss Thailand Universe 2009, but both did not place.

References

External links
 Miss Thailand Universe official website
 MTU on facebook
 T-Pageant Club

2011
2011 beauty pageants
2011 in Bangkok
March 2011 events in Thailand
Beauty pageants in Thailand